Tetrathemis irregularis is a species of dragonfly in the family Libellulidae, 
known as the rainforest elf. 
It is a tiny to small, slender dragonfly with black and yellow markings. It inhabits rainforest streams in north-eastern Australia
and Southeast Asia, including the Aru Islands.

Subspecies
The species Tetrathemis irregularis includes the following subspecies:
Tetrathemis irregularis irregularis  - found in South-east Asia and New Guinea
Tetrathemis irregularis cladophila  - found in Australia and the Aru islands

See also
 List of Odonata species of Australia

References

Libellulidae
Odonata of Asia
Odonata of Australia
Insects of Southeast Asia
Insects of New Guinea
Taxa named by Friedrich Moritz Brauer
Insects described in 1868